Khalifeh may refer to:
 Khalifeh, Dashtestan, Bushehr Province
 Khalifeh, Ganaveh, Bushehr Province
 Khalifeh, Chaharmahal and Bakhtiari
 Khalifeh Kandi (disambiguation), places in East Azerbaijan
 Khalifeh, Kermanshah
 Khalifeh Bapir, Kermanshah Province
 Khalifeh, Khuzestan
 Khalifeh, Kohgiluyeh and Boyer-Ahmad
 Khalifeh Torkhan, Kurdistan Province
 Khalifeh, Lorestan
 Khalifeh, West Azerbaijan
 Khalifeh, Zanjan

See also
 Khalifeh Kandi (disambiguation)
 Khalifehi (disambiguation)
 Mal-e Khalifeh
 Qaleh Khalifeh (disambiguation)